"No More" is the title of a number-one R&B single by group Ruff Endz. The song spent one week at number one on the US R&B chart and peaked at number five on the US pop chart. The song is the duo's best-selling and known single to date.

Charts

Weekly charts

Year-end charts

Remix
The remix features with R.E.D.B.O.N.E., Candice, Ghostface Killah, Raekwon, Cam'ron and Puerto Rock.

References

2000 singles
2000 songs
Ruff Endz songs
Music videos credited to Alan Smithee
Songs written by Balewa Muhammad
Epic Records singles